Stegosoma may refer to:
 Stegosoma (insect), a genus of flies in the family Rhiniidae
 Stegosoma, a genus of tunicates in the family Oikopleuridae; synonym of Caudostegosoma
 Stegosoma, a genus of arachnids in the unknown family, described in 1873 by Cambridge